St. Michael's and All Angels Church or for short St. Michael is an Anglican church in the city of Sandakan in the Malaysian state of Sabah in northern Borneo. St. Michael is the oldest stone church in Sabah. The impetus for the construction of the church dates back to the clergyman William Henry Elton, who is also known as the founder of St. Michael's Secondary School, located next to the church.

The church is also part of the Sandakan Heritage Trails, a Heritage Trail which connects the historic sights and monuments of Sandakan.

History
The North Borneo Chartered Company controlled North Borneo in 1881. The mostly British employees of the company desired for an Anglican church to be established. Initially, laymen were used to conduct religious ceremonies in a detached room in the Colonial Secretary's House and, if present, would take over the service from the highest-ranking government officials, Governor William Hood Treacher. William Burgess Pryer, founder of Sandakan and an active layman himself, already wrote in January 1883 a pleading letter to the head of the Anglican Communion, the Archbishop of Canterbury. During mid-1888, a news reached Sandakan that Reverend William Henry Elton was appointed as a priest for Sandakan.

Elton arrived in Sandakan on 2 September 1888. Governor Charles Vandeleur Creagh asked the religious authority to select a vacant piece of land for the construction of a mission station. Assisted by Von Donop, Elton explored in the following weeks around the forest and finally found a two-acre property, in which the construction of a temporary church with the associated vicariate, schools for boys and girls and the necessary outbuildings seemed suitable. His plan was unanimously adopted on 5 October 1888.

The church building is also the first completely built stone building in Sabah. The foundation stone was laid on 29 September 1893 by Governor Creagh and it took more than 30 years to complete.

When the plans of the New Zealand architect BW Mountfort were unveiled, Elton was hugely involved in choosing the materials. The use of Eusideroxylon zwageri (Bornean belian wood) would dramatically increase the cost of construction, while the usage of bricks was not considered to be cosmetically pleasing, so they finally agreed on a building made of stone blocks, specifically granite. While the white stones that adorn the windows and doors were imported from Hong Kong, the darker stones came from a quarry near Kampong Buli Sim Sim, where they were carved by prisoners at a cost of about 1.50 Straits dollar per cubic meter. One of the stone blocks is 30 cm in length and weighed about 63 kilograms.

The sanctification of the main nave was made on 30 September 1906 during Michaelmas. The western portal, which is the main entrance to the church, was not completed at that time and was consecrated only in 1925, 32 years after construction began. In May 1941 Rev Reuben Henthorne and Rev Denis W.A. Brown were interned by the Japanese. Services continued at the church until 1943 when it was closed and used as a store. The church was dynamited by the Japanese forces before surrender in 1945 as World War II ended, although the shell of the church remained standing. Reconstruction began soon after the war, and St Michael's is still one of the few historic stone buildings in Sabah. The coloured stained glass windows were donated to commemorate the 60th anniversary of the end of the World War II by Australians.

Memorial Stone 
At the northwest corner of the church is a memorial stone erected in 1988, commemorating the 100th anniversary of the parish. On the stone, a metal plate is fitted with the inscription:

Below the plaque are two time capsules that are to be opened in 2038 and 2088.

Pastors and priests of St. Michael
Since the founding of the parish in 1888, the following persons acted as pastors and priests of St. Michael:

Literature
 Reverend Brian Taylor: THE ELTON HILL ‘DIARY’ — The story of the founding of St. Michael’s Church (PDF; 3,1 MB) Lai Hing & Company, 1976
 75 Years on Elton Hill, The History of St. Michael’s Church Sandakan, North Borneo, hrsg. vom Church Council of St. Michael’s, Sandakan, 1963; Festschrift

See also

 Anglicanism
 Anglican Communion
 Christianity in Malaysia
 Church of the Province of South East Asia
 Diocese of Sabah

References

Anglican church buildings in Malaysia
History of North Borneo
Churches in Sandakan
1920s establishments in Sabah